Berthin Telolahy (born November 15, 1958 in Antananarivo) is a Malagasy politician. He is a member of the Senate of Madagascar for Ihorombe, and is a member of the Tiako I Madagasikara party.

References

1958 births
Living people
Members of the Senate (Madagascar)
Tiako I Madagasikara politicians